The 1950 St. Bonaventure Bonnies football team, sometimes also referred to as the St. Bonaventure Brown Indians, was an American football team that represented St. Bonaventure University during the 1950 college football season. In its first season under head coach Joe Bach, the team compiled a 7–2 record and outscored opponents by a total of 253 to 148. The team played its home games at Forness Stadium in Olean, New York.

Quarterback Ted Marchibroda led the team on offense. He set Eastern passing records with 176 passing yards against Xavier on Thanksgiving Day and 1,577 passing yards for the season.  The season mark broke the prior record set by Paul Governali in 1942. 

Stan Zajdel and John Breslin were the team's co-captains. Assistant coaches included Russ Thomas (line coach) and Hugo Marcolini (backfield coach).

Schedule

References

St. Bonaventure
St. Bonaventure Brown Indians football seasons
St. Bonaventure Bonnies football